This is a survey of the postage stamps and postal history of Griqualand West, a former British colony that is now part of South Africa.

First stamps
The first stamps used in Griqualand West were stamps of Cape of Good Hope from October 1871 which can be identified by their cancellations.

In September 1877, Cape 4 pence stamps were used hand surcharged by the Kimberley postmaster "1d" in ink.

The first stamps specifically for Griqualand West were issued in March 1877 and consisted of stamps of Cape of Good Hope overprinted G. W. or G.

In 1880, Griqualand West was annexed by the Cape Colony.

See also
Postage stamps and postal history of the Cape of Good Hope

References

Further reading
 Goldblatt, Robert. Postmarks of the Cape of Good Hope: the postal history and markings of the Cape of Good Hope and Griqualand West 1792-1910. Cape Town: Reijger Publishers (Pty) Ltd., 1984  267p. and 1988 supplement (47p.)
 Holmes, H.R. The postage stamps of Griqualand West. London: Royal Philatelic Society London, 1963 13p.

External links
Identifying Griqualand West forgeries.

Boer Republics
Griqualand West
Griqualand West